Gardner Raymond Dozois (July 23, 1947 – May 27, 2018) was an American science fiction author and editor. He was the founding editor of The Year's Best Science Fiction anthologies (1984–2018) and was editor of Asimov's Science Fiction magazine (1986–2004), garnering multiple Hugo and Locus Awards for those works almost every year. He also won the Nebula Award for Best Short Story twice. He was inducted to the Science Fiction Hall of Fame on June 25, 2011.

Biography
Dozois was born July 23, 1947, in Salem, Massachusetts. He graduated from Salem High School with the Class of 1965. From 1966 to 1969 he served in the Army as a journalist, after which he moved to New York City to work as an editor in the science fiction field. One of his stories had been published by Frederik Pohl in the September 1966 issue of If but his next four appeared in 1970, three in Damon Knight's anthology series Orbit.

Dozois said that he turned to reading fiction partially as an escape from the provincialism of his home town.

He was badly injured in a taxi accident after returning from a Philadelphia Phillies game in 2004 (causing him to miss Worldcon for the first time in many years) but made a full recovery. On July 6, 2007, Dozois had surgery for a planned quintuple bypass operation. A week later, he experienced complications which prompted additional surgery to implant a defibrillator.

Dozois died on May 27, 2018, of a systemic infection at a hospital in Philadelphia at the age of 70.

Fiction 
As a writer, Dozois mainly worked in shorter forms. He won the Nebula Award for Best Short Story twice: once for "The Peacemaker" in 1983, and again for "Morning Child" in 1984. His short fiction has been collected in The Visible Man (1977), Geodesic Dreams (a best-of collection), Slow Dancing through Time (1990, collaborations), Strange Days (2001, another best-of collection), Morning Child and Other Stories (2004) and When the Great Days Come (2011). As a novelist, Dozois's oeuvre is significantly smaller. He was the author of one solo novel, Strangers (1978), as well as a collaboration with George Alec Effinger, Nightmare Blue (1977), and a collaboration with George R. R. Martin and Daniel Abraham for Hunter's Run (2008). After becoming editor of Asimov's, Dozois's fiction output dwindled. His 2006 novelette "Counterfactual" won the Sidewise Award for best alternate-history short story. Dozois also wrote short fiction reviews for Locus.

Michael Swanwick, one of his co-authors, completed a long interview with Dozois covering every published piece of his fiction. Being Gardner Dozois: An Interview by Michael Swanwick was published by Old Earth Books in 2001. It won the Locus Award for Non-Fiction and was a finalist for the Hugo Award for Best Related Book.

Editorial work
Dozois was known primarily as an editor, winning the Hugo Award for Best Professional Editor 15 times in 17 years from 1988 to his retirement from Asimov's in 2004. George R. R. Martin described him as the most important and influential editor in science fiction since John W. Campbell. In addition to his work with Asimov's (of which he was the first associate editor in 1976), he also worked in the 1970s with magazines such as Galaxy Science Fiction, If, Worlds of Fantasy, and Worlds of Tomorrow.

Dozois was also a prolific short fiction anthologist. After resigning from his Asimov's position, he remained the editor of the anthology series The Year's Best Science Fiction, published annually since 1984. In three decades Locus readers have voted it the year's best anthology almost 20 times and the runner-up almost 10 times. And, with Jack Dann, he edited a long series of themed anthologies, each with a self-explanatory title such as Cats, Dinosaurs, Seaserpents, or Hackers.

Stories selected by Gardner Dozois for the annual best-of-year volumes have won, as of December 2015, 44 Hugos, 41 Nebulas, 32 Locus, 10 World Fantasy and 18 Sturgeon Awards. That also includes the Dutton series (Dozois volumes only).

Dozois consistently expressed a particular interest in adventure SF and space opera, which he collectively referred to as "center-core SF".

Bibliography

Fiction

Novels
Nightmare Blue (with George Alec Effinger) (1975)
Strangers (1978)
Hunter's Run (2008) (with George R. R. Martin and Daniel Abraham)
City Under the Stars (2020) (with Michael Swanwick)

Collections
The Visible Man (1977)
Slow Dancing Through Time (1990)
Geodesic Dreams (1992)
Strange Days: Fabulous Journeys with Gardner Dozois (2001)
Morning Child and Other Stories (2004)
When the Great Days Come (2011)

Short stories
"A Special Kind of Morning" (1971)
"Chains of the Sea" (1971)
"Machines of Loving Grace" (1972)
"A Traveler in an Antique Land" (1983)
"The Peacemaker" (1983) (Nebula Award winner)
"Morning Child" (1984) (Nebula Award winner)
"A Knight of Ghosts and Shadows" (1999)
"The Hanging Curve" (The Magazine of Fantasy and Science Fiction, April 2002)
"When the Great Days Came" (The Magazine of Fantasy and Science Fiction, Dec 2005)
"Shadow Twin" (2005) (with George R. R. Martin and Daniel Abraham)
"Counterfactual" (The Magazine of Fantasy and Science Fiction, June 2006)
"Neanderthals" (The Magazine of Fantasy and Science Fiction, Jan/Feb 2018)

Anthologies
Edited by Gardner Dozois

A Day in the Life (1972)
Future Power (1976, ASIN B000H75MWC) (co-edited with Jack Dann)
Another World: Adventures in Otherness (1977)
Ripper (1988) (co-edited with Susan Casper)
Modern Classics of Science Fiction (1992)
Future Earths: Under African Skies (1993) (co-edited with Mike Resnick)
Future Earths: Under South American Skies (1993) (co-edited with Mike Resnick)
Modern Classic Short Novels of Science Fiction (1994)
Mammoth Book of Contemporary SF Masters (1994)
Killing Me Softly (1995, ASIN B000OEN80G)
Dying for It (1997, ASIN B000H40WZC)
Modern Classics of Fantasy (1997)
Roads Not Taken: Tales of Alternate History (1998) (co-edited with Stanley Schmidt)
The Good Old Stuff: Adventure SF in the Grand Tradition (1998)
The Good New Stuff: Adventure SF in the Grand Tradition (1999)
Explorers: SF Adventures to Far Horizons (2000)
The Furthest Horizon: SF Adventures to the Far Future (2000)
Worldmakers: SF Adventures in Terraforming (2001)
Supermen: Tales of the Posthuman Future (2002)
Galileo's Children: Tales of Science vs. Superstition (2005)
One Million A.D. (2005)
Nebula Awards Showcase 2006 (2006)
Escape From Earth: New Adventures in Space (2006) (co-edited with Jack Dann)
Wizards: Magical Tales from the Masters of Modern Fantasy (2007) (co-edited with Jack Dann)
The New Space Opera (2007) (co-edited with Jonathan Strahan)
Galactic Empires (2007)
The New Space Opera 2 (2009) (co-edited with Jonathan Strahan)
The Book of Swords (2017)
The Book of Magic (2018)

Cross-genre anthologies co-edited by Dozois and Martin
Songs of the Dying Earth, a tribute anthology to Jack Vance's seminal Dying Earth series, published by Subterranean Press (co-edited with George R. R. Martin) (2009)
Warriors, a cross-genre anthology featuring stories about war and warriors (co-edited with George R. R. Martin) (2010); Locus Award
Songs of Love and Death, a cross-genre anthology featuring stories of romance in fantasy and science fiction settings (co-edited with George R. R. Martin) (2010)
Down These Strange Streets, a cross-genre anthology featuring stories of private-eye detectives in fantasy and science fiction settings (co-edited with George R. R. Martin) (November 2011) 
Old Mars, an anthology featuring new stories about Mars in retro-SF vein (co-edited with George R. R. Martin) (2013); Locus Award
Dangerous Women, a cross-genre anthology featuring stories about women warriors (co-edited with George R. R. Martin) (2013)
Rogues, a cross-genre anthology featuring stories about assorted rogues (co-edited with George R. R. Martin) (2014)
Old Venus, an anthology featuring new stories about Venus in retro-SF vein (co-edited with George R. R. Martin) (2015)

Themed anthology series co-edited by Dozois and Dann

Formerly known as "Magic Tales Anthology Series" until 1995; most released under the Ace imprint.
Aliens! (April 1980, Pocket Books)
Unicorns! (May 1982)
Magicats! (June 1984)
Bestiary! (October 1985)
Mermaids! (January 1986)
Sorcerers! (October 1986)
Demons! (July 1987)
Dogtales! (September 1988)
Seaserpents! (December 1989)
Dinosaurs! (June 1990)
Little People! (March 1991)
Magicats II (December 1991)
Unicorns II (November 1992)
Dragons! (August 1993)
Invaders! (December 1993)
Horses! (May 1994)
Angels! (June 1995)
Dinosaurs II (December 1995)
Hackers (October 1996)
Timegates (March 1997)
Clones (April 1998)
Immortals (July 1998)
Nanotech (December 1998)
Future War (August 1999)
Armageddons (November 1999)
Aliens Among Us (June 2000)
Genometry (January 2001)
Space Soldiers (April 2001)
Future Sports (June 2002)
Beyond Flesh (December 2002)
Future Crimes (December 2003)
A.I.s (December 2004)
Robots (August 2005)
Beyond Singularity (December 2005)
Escape from Earth (August 2006, Science Fiction Book Club)
Futures Past (November 2006)
Dangerous Games (April 2007)
Wizards (May 2007)
The Dragon Book (November 2009)

Anthologies co-edited by Dozois and Greg Bear
 Multiverse: Exploring Poul Anderson's Worlds (2014)

"Isaac Asimov's" anthology series

Transcendental Tales from Isaac Asimov's Science Fiction Magazine (1989)
Time Travelers from Isaac Asimov's Science Fiction Magazine (1989)
Isaac Asimov's Robots (1991) (co-edited with Sheila Williams)
Isaac Asimov's Aliens (1991)
Isaac Asimov's Mars (1991)
Isaac Asimov's Earth (1992) (co-edited with Sheila Williams)
Isaac Asimov's War (1993)
Isaac Asimov's SF Lite (1993)
Isaac Asimov's Cyberdreams (1994)
Isaac Asimov's Skin Deep (1995) (co-edited with Sheila Williams)
Isaac Asimov's Ghosts (1995) (co-edited with Sheila Williams)
Isaac Asimov's Vampires (1996) (co-edited with Sheila Williams)
Isaac Asimov's Moons (1997) (co-edited with Sheila Williams)
Isaac Asimov's Christmas (1997) (co-edited with Sheila Williams)
Isaac Asimov's Detectives (1998) (co-edited with Sheila Williams)
Isaac Asimov's Camelot (1998) (co-edited with Sheila Williams)
Isaac Asimov's Solar System (1999) (co-edited with Sheila Williams)
Isaac Asimov's Werewolves (1999) (co-edited with Sheila Williams)
Isaac Asimov's Valentines (1999) (co-edited with Sheila Williams)
Isaac Asimov's Halloween (1999) (co-edited with Sheila Williams)
Isaac Asimov's Utopias (2000) (co-edited with Sheila Williams)
Isaac Asimov's Mother's Day (2000) (co-edited with Sheila Williams)
Isaac Asimov's Father's Day (2001) (co-edited with Sheila Williams)

The Year's Best Science Fiction series

 The Year's Best Science Fiction: First Annual Collection (1984)
 The Year's Best Science Fiction: Second Annual Collection (1985)
 The Year's Best Science Fiction: Third Annual Collection (1986)
 The Year's Best Science Fiction: Fourth Annual Collection (1987)
 The Year's Best Science Fiction: Fifth Annual Collection (1988)
 The Year's Best Science Fiction: Sixth Annual Collection (1989)
 The Year's Best Science Fiction: Seventh Annual Collection (1990)
 The Year's Best Science Fiction: Eighth Annual Collection (1991)
 The Year's Best Science Fiction: Ninth Annual Collection (1992)
 The Year's Best Science Fiction: Tenth Annual Collection (1993)
 The Year's Best Science Fiction: Eleventh Annual Collection (1994)
 The Year's Best Science Fiction: Twelfth Annual Collection (1995)
 The Year's Best Science Fiction: Thirteenth Annual Collection (1996)
 The Year's Best Science Fiction: Fourteenth Annual Collection (1997)
 The Year's Best Science Fiction: Fifteenth Annual Collection (1998)
 The Year's Best Science Fiction: Sixteenth Annual Collection (1999)
 The Year's Best Science Fiction: Seventeenth Annual Collection (2000)
 The Year's Best Science Fiction: Eighteenth Annual Collection (2001)
 The Year's Best Science Fiction: Nineteenth Annual Collection (2002)
 The Year's Best Science Fiction: Twentieth Annual Collection (2003)
 The Year's Best Science Fiction: Twenty-First Annual Collection (2004)
 The Year's Best Science Fiction: Twenty-Second Annual Collection (2005)
 The Year's Best Science Fiction: Twenty-Third Annual Collection (2006)
 The Year's Best Science Fiction: Twenty-Fourth Annual Collection (2007)
 The Year's Best Science Fiction: Twenty-Fifth Annual Collection (2008)
 The Year's Best Science Fiction: Twenty-Sixth Annual Collection (2009)
 The Year's Best Science Fiction: Twenty-Seventh Annual Collection (2010)
 The Year's Best Science Fiction: Twenty-Eighth Annual Collection (2011)
 The Year's Best Science Fiction: Twenty-Ninth Annual Collection (2012)
 The Year's Best Science Fiction: Thirtieth Annual Collection (2013)
 The Year's Best Science Fiction: Thirty-First Annual Collection (2014)
 The Year's Best Science Fiction: Thirty-Second Annual Collection (2015)
 The Year's Best Science Fiction: Thirty-Third Annual Collection (2016)
 The Year's Best Science Fiction: Thirty-Fourth Annual Collection (2017)
 The Year's Best Science Fiction: Thirty-Fifth Annual Collection (2018)
 Best of the Best: 20 Years of the Year's Best Science Fiction (2005) (Anthology from previous Year's Best Science Fiction editions)
 Best of the Best Volume 2: 20 Years of the Year's Best Short Science Fiction Novels (2007) (Anthology from previous Year's Best Science Fiction editions)

Dozois also edited volumes six through ten of the Best Science Fiction Stories of the Year series after Lester del Rey edited the first five volumes. That series began in 1972 and ended in 1981.

Nonfiction 
The Fiction of James Tiptree, Jr. (1977)
Writing Science Fiction & Fantasy (1993) (co-edited with Stanley Schmidt and Sheila Williams)

Critical studies and reviews of Dozois' work
Old Venus
 

See also
 

References

External links
Interviews
The SF Site: A Conversation with Gardner Dozois
Locus Online: Gardner Dozois Interview (excerpt)

Other
 
 
Profile of Gardner Dozois , Philcon 97 Program Book, copy at Michael Swanwick Online
Gardner Dozois at Asimovs.com 
, SFWA Recommended Reading Lists, no date – "devised to direct younger readers to older stuff"
Gardner Dozois's online fiction at Free Speculative Fiction Online''
 Gardner Dozois at Library of Congress Authorities – with 96 catalog records

1947 births
2018 deaths
Writers from Salem, Massachusetts
Military personnel from Massachusetts
20th-century American novelists
21st-century American novelists
American male novelists
American science fiction writers
Science fiction editors
Hugo Award-winning editors
Nebula Award winners
Science Fiction Hall of Fame inductees
Sidewise Award winners
American male short story writers
20th-century American short story writers
21st-century American short story writers
American speculative fiction editors
20th-century American male writers
21st-century American male writers
Male speculative fiction editors
Salem High School (Massachusetts) alumni